Amata xanthopleura is a moth of the family Erebidae. It was described by George Hampson in 1914. It is found in Uganda.

References

 

Xanthopleura
Moths of Africa
Endemic fauna of Uganda
Moths described in 1914